Gaius Octavius may refer to;
 Gaius Octavius (tribune 216 BC) (fl. 216 BC), military tribune
 Gaius Octavius (proconsul) (c. 100–59 BC), praetor in 61 BC
 Augustus or Gaius Octavius Thurinus (63 BC–AD 14), first Roman Emperor
 Gaius Octavius Laenas, curator of the aqueducts in Rome (AD 34–38)
 Gaius Octavius Lampadio, ancient Roman
 Gaius Octavius Appius Suetrius Sabinus, senator and consul (214 and 240)

See also
 Gaius
 Gnaeus Octavius (disambiguation)
 Lucius Octavius (name)
 Marcus Octavius (name)
 Octavius (disambiguation)